Marlboro High School (MHS) is the Marlboro Central School District's high school located in Marlboro, New York, United States.

Marlboro High School is a comprehensive, four-year institution for students in Grades 9-12. It is accredited by the Middle States Association of Schools.  The curriculum consists of honor courses, college preparatory and occupationally related programs.  The school also has a cooperative college bridge program with Ulster County Community College in the areas of English, history, government, economics, science, psychology, sociology, mathematics, and Spanish.

As of the 2014-15 school year, the school had an enrollment of 624 students and 42.7 classroom teachers (on an FTE basis), for a student–teacher ratio of 14.6:1. There were 115 students (18.4% of enrollment) eligible for free lunch and 48 (7.7% of students) eligible for reduced-cost lunch.

Academics 
Marlboro offers a curriculum that includes Advanced Placement classes, college bridge courses, and other course offerings. College bridge courses are offered through Ulster County Community College. In addition, there are online courses offered.

Athletics 
Marlboro competes in Section 9 of the New York State Public High School Athletic Association (NYSPHAA).

Notable alumni
 Rob Bell, former MLB pitcher
 Brian Benben, actor 
 Dee Brown, former MLB player
 Scott Lobdell, comic book writer
 Margaret Russo (1931-2006), shortstop who played from 1950 through 1954 in the All-American Girls Professional Baseball League
 Brianna Titone, Colorado state representative (HD27) 
 Snooki, MTV television personality

References

External links
School website
Marlboro grad DeMartine named to softball Hall

Public high schools in New York (state)
Schools in Ulster County, New York